The St. Joseph's Cathedral or Latin Cathedral of St. Joseph is a Catholic cathedral located in Baghdad, the capital of Iraq.

Because it is in the jurisdiction of the Latin Church, it is sometimes called the Latin Cathedral of St. Joseph in order to distinguish it from the Chaldean Cathedral of St. Joseph dedicated to the same saint but belonging to the Chaldean Catholic Church (also in communion with the Holy See).

St. Joseph's functions as the cathedral of the Archdiocese of Baghdad (Bagdathensis Latinorum) which was established in 1643 as a diocese and elevated to its present status in 1848.

It was originally a chapel built in 1866 to replace a smaller structure dating from 1721.

See also
Roman Catholicism in Iraq
St. Joseph's Cathedral (disambiguation)

References

Roman Catholic cathedrals in Iraq
Churches in Baghdad
Roman Catholic churches completed in 1965
20th-century Roman Catholic church buildings